Shelby Stephenson (born June 14, 1938) is an American poet. On December 22, 2014, he was named by Governor Pat McCrory as the ninth North Carolina Poet Laureate, a position he is set to hold from 2014 to 2016.

Biography
Stephenson was born in Benson, Johnston County, North Carolina to Maytle and Paul Stephenson in 1938, and lived for fourteen years with his parents and three older siblings Paul, Marshall, and Rose Stephenson in a rural farmhouse known as "Plankhouse." In 1952, the Stephensons moved to a new house, and Shelby graduated from high school in 1956; he earned his bachelor's degree from the University of North Carolina at Chapel Hill in 1960, his master's degree from the University of Pittsburgh in 1967, and his Doctorate from the University of Wisconsin in 1974. He met his wife, Linda Letchworth "Nin" Wilson, on a blind date in 1963, and the two married in 1966.

He moved back to North Carolina in the 1970s and went on to become a teacher, serving as the English department chair at Campbell College from 1974 to 1978 before becoming a professor of English at the University of North Carolina at Pembroke and the editor of Pembroke Magazine from 1978 until retiring in 2010. From 2004 to 2005, he was the Gilbert-Chappell Distinguished Poet. He currently lives with his Norwich Terrier named Cricket, while his ailing wife lives in an extended care facility in Smithfield.

In October 2014, Stephenson was inducted into the North Carolina Literary Hall of Fame, along with Betty Adcock, Ronald H. Bayes, and Jaki Shelton Green. He was later installed as the state's new poet laureate on February 2, 2015, in a ceremony at the State Capitol with Governor Pat McCrory, Cultural Resources Secretary Susan Kluttz, and Wayne Martin, Executive Director of the North Carolina Arts Council.

Stephenson hopes to pursue three projects during his tenure as state laureate: holding writing workshops in assisted living and retirement communities, raising awareness of local archives and family histories, and promoting writings about farming and farm life in North Carolina.

Poet Laureate
Following the controversy surrounding the appointment of former state Laureate Valerie Macon, Governor McCrory said: "I've learned my lesson. It's been a learning process for me, too." Secretary Kluttz said: "I am thrilled at the choice of Shelby Stephenson as North Carolina's poet laureate," said Susan Kluttz, secretary of the N.C. Department of Cultural Resources. "He received many strong nominations, backed up by his impressive resume. He is a wonderful representative of the outstanding poets that flourish in our state. I look forward to working with him in the coming years."

Former Poet Laureate Kathryn Stripling Byer also said: "He's just good, both as a person and as a poet. ... His poetic voice just flows like a spring. He's a natural and we really need a voice like his right now with all the divisions we have in this state", adding that "the choice is brilliant, and I am rejoicing in the news. Shelby is a longtime friend, a powerful voice in North Carolina literature. A singer, an old-time raconteur, a poet attuned to the rhythms of our state and its people. I offer my joyful congratulations to one of our state's literary treasures. This is a splendid Christmas gift to North Carolinians, all of us. And for those who keep saying they don't like poetry, just wait till you hear Shelby. You will change your mind in a flash."

Bibliography
Stephenson published his first poem, "Whales Are Hard to See," in the Davidson Miscellany 1973.

Poetry
 Middle Creek Poems (1979)
 Carolina Shout! (1985)
 Finch's Mash (1990)
 Plankhouse (1993)
 Poor People (1998)
 Fiddledeedee (2001)
 The Persimmon Tree Carol (2002)
 Possum (2004)
 Family Matters: Home to July, the Slave Girl (2008) – winner of the 2008 Bellday Poetry Prize
 Playing Dead (2011)
 Country(2018) http://www.theblackmountainpress.com

Music
 Hank Williams Tribute
 Sing the Old Songs (2004)
 When Country Was Country (2007)
 Sing Don Gibson (2012)

References

Poets Laureate of North Carolina
Poets from North Carolina
Living people
1938 births
People from Benson, North Carolina
University of North Carolina at Chapel Hill alumni
University of Pittsburgh alumni
University of Wisconsin–Madison alumni